Jove Peak is a  mountain summit located  north of Stevens Pass on the common border of Snohomish County with Chelan County in Washington state. Jove Peak was named by Albert Hale Sylvester for Jove in association with the mythology-theme of nearby Minotaur and Theseus Lakes which are near Labyrinth Mountain,  to the northeast. Precipitation runoff from the peak drains west into headwaters of Rapid River, or east into Rainy Creek which is a tributary of the Little Wenatchee River.

Climate

Jove Peak is located in the marine west coast climate zone of western North America. Most weather fronts originate in the Pacific Ocean, and travel east toward the Cascade Mountains. As fronts approach, they are forced upward by the peaks of the Cascade Range, causing them to drop their moisture in the form of rain or snowfall onto the Cascades (Orographic lift). As a result, of lying on the Cascade crest, the area around Jove Peak experiences high precipitation, especially during the winter months in the form of snowfall. During winter months, weather is usually cloudy, but, due to high pressure systems over the Pacific Ocean that intensify during summer months, there is often little or no cloud cover during the summer. Summers can bring occasional thunderstorms. The months July through September offer the most favorable weather for viewing or climbing this peak, but Jove Peak is also a skiing destination in winter.

Geology

The North Cascades features some of the most rugged topography in the Cascade Range with craggy peaks, ridges, and deep glacial valleys. Geological events occurring many years ago created the diverse topography and drastic elevation changes over the Cascade Range leading to various climate differences.

The history of the formation of the Cascade Mountains dates back millions of years ago to the late Eocene Epoch. With the North American Plate overriding the Pacific Plate, episodes of volcanic igneous activity persisted. In addition, small fragments of the oceanic and continental lithosphere called terranes created the North Cascades about 50 million years ago.

During the Pleistocene period dating back over two million years ago, glaciation advancing and retreating repeatedly scoured and shaped the landscape. Uplift and faulting in combination with glaciation have been the dominant processes which have created the tall peaks and deep valleys of the North Cascades area.

See also

 Geology of the Pacific Northwest
 Geography of the North Cascades

References

External links
 Weather forecast: Jove Peak
 climbing Union & Jove Peaks: Mountaineers.org

Mountains of Chelan County, Washington
Mountains of Snohomish County, Washington
Mountains of Washington (state)
Cascade Range
North Cascades
North American 1000 m summits